Given Lubinda is a Zambian politician who served in the Cabinet of Zambia as Minister of Justice. He is a former Member of Parliament for the National Assembly of Zambia for Kabwata Constituency in Lusaka. He was first elected as Kabwata MP in 2001 under the UPND ticket and was Minister of Foreign Affairs from 2012 to 2013. Following the retirement of Edgar Lungu from active politics, Given Lubinda is the current acting president of the former ruling party, the Patriotic Front as of 2021. Lubinda is of mixed-race parentage. He is known as an outspoken politician.

Following the death of President Levy Mwanawasa, he came under criticism from both members of the ruling Movement for Multiparty Democracy and the opposition for voicing concerns on issues such as expenditure after the government planned and eventually increased salaries and allowances for both ministers and members of Parliament.

In January 2012 he bungee-jumped from the Victoria Falls bridge to restore confidence in the jump arrangements after Australian Erin Langworthy's rope broke during her jump. He has offered to jump again with Langworthy.

Removal from government
In February 2013, Lubinda was removed from his position as Minister of Foreign Affairs after being accused of leaking information to the opposition United Party for National Development, a party he previously belonged to. This was viewed as a result of pressure on the president to remove a potential successor by other ministers who were vying for the presidency.

After Sata's death in 2014, Lubinda was appointed as Minister of Agriculture and Livestock by President Edgar Lungu on 12 February 2015.

References

Members of the National Assembly of Zambia
Living people
Patriotic Front (Zambia) politicians
1963 births
Justice Ministers of Zambia